The John Nance Garner House, located in Uvalde, Texas, United States, was the home of American Vice-President John Nance Garner and his wife Ettie from 1920 until Ettie's death in 1948. Garner, a native of Uvalde, lived there until 1952, when he moved to a small cottage on the property and donated the main house to the City of Uvalde as a memorial to Mrs. Garner. The house is now known as the Briscoe-Garner Museum, and also known as the Ettie R. Garner Memorial Building.

The structure is a two-story, H-shaped, hip-roofed, brick house with white trim around doors and windows, and brown shingles on the roof.  It was built to plans by Atlee B. Ayres, at the time the most prominent architect in San Antonio, if not the state. The building housed the community library until about 1973. It then became a museum, using the first floor for displays documenting Garner's life and career.

The main house and cottage were designated a National Historic Landmark and listed on the National Register of Historic Places on December 8, 1976.

On November 20, 1999, the City of Uvalde transferred ownership of the Garner Home and Museum to the University of Texas at Austin, whereupon it became a division of the Dolph Briscoe Center for American History. In 2011, the University closed the house to the public for renovations. The displays were moved to the First State Bank of Uvalde main branch lobby. When the renovations are complete, the first floor will still be devoted to Garner, and the second floor will have new exhibits dedicated to Dolph Briscoe, the 41st Governor of Texas and also a Uvalde native.

See also

National Register of Historic Places listings in Uvalde County, Texas
List of National Historic Landmarks in Texas
Recorded Texas Historic Landmarks in Uvalde County

References

External links

Briscoe-Garner Museum - Dolph Briscoe Center for American History
Texas Historic Sites Atlas

Museums in Uvalde County, Texas
National Historic Landmarks in Texas
Houses completed in 1920
Historic house museums in Texas
University of Texas at Austin
Garner, John Nance
Atlee B. Ayres buildings
Houses on the National Register of Historic Places in Texas
National Register of Historic Places in Uvalde County, Texas
Recorded Texas Historic Landmarks
Uvalde, Texas